Qu (also transliterated Gao) was Mansa of the Mali Empire between 1300 and 1305.

Qu was one of two sons of Kolonkan, a sister of the legendary founder Sundiata Keita.  Qu assumed the throne following the murder of the usurper Sakura on his return from the hajj.  He ruled until 1305, when he was succeeded by his son Mohammad ibn Qu.

References

See also
Mali Empire
Keita Dynasty

1305 deaths
People of the Mali Empire
Mansas of Mali
14th-century monarchs in Africa
Year of birth unknown
Keita family